Ura Basket, also known as Ura, is a basketball club based in Kaarina, Finland. The club made its debut in the top tier Korisliiga in 2018, after winning the First Division championship.

Honours
First Division
Winners (1): 2017–18

Notable players
- Set a club record or won an individual award as a professional player.
- Played at least one official international match for his senior national team at any time.

References

External links
Official website (in Finnish)
2018-19 Korisliiga team page (in Finnish)
Twitter (in Finnish)

Basketball teams in Finland
Basketball teams established in 2005
2005 establishments in Finland